Richard Bates may refer to:
Richard Bates (Medal of Honor) (1829–1889), U.S. Navy sailor and Medal of Honor recipient
Richard Bates (Wiltshire cricketer) (born 1972), English cricketer
Richard Bates (Nottinghamshire cricketer) (born 1972), English cricketer
Richard B. Bates (1843–1910), American politician
Richard Dawson Bates (1876–1949), Northern Irish politician
Sir Richard Geoffrey Bates, 6th Baronet (1946–2002), of the Bates baronets
Dick Bates (born 1945), American baseball player

See also
Bates (surname)
Rick Bates, Australian rally driver
Dick Bate (1946–2018), English football coach